Cyme aroa is a moth of the  family Erebidae. It is found in New Guinea.

References

Nudariina
Moths described in 1904
Moths of New Guinea